is a railway station in Nagasaki City, Nagasaki Prefecture, Japan. It is operated by JR Kyushu and is on the Nagasaki Main Line.

Lines

Station layout 
The station consists of a side platform serving a single track on a sidehill cutting. From the station entrance on the access road, a flight of steps and a ramp lead up to the platform. There is no station building. A small shed at the station entrance houses a ticket window which is, however, no longer staffed. An automatic ticket vending machine and a SUGOCA card reader is provided. Limited parking is available by the side of access road.

Adjacent stations

History
Hizen-Koga was opened on the same day as one of the intermediate stations along this new route. With the privatization of JNR on 1 April 1987, control of the station passed to JR Kyushu.

In January 2015, JR Kyushu announced that Hizen-Koga would become an unstaffed station from 14 March 2015. This was part of a major effort by the company to reduce its operating deficit by ceasing to staff 32 stations in its network.

Passenger statistics
In fiscal 2016, the station was used by an average of 423 passengers daily (boarding passengers only), and it ranked 262nd  among the busiest stations of JR Kyushu.

Environs
Route 34
Nagasaki City Koga Elementary School

References

External links 

Hizen-Koga Station (JR Kyushu)

Railway stations in Nagasaki Prefecture
Nagasaki Main Line
Railway stations in Japan opened in 1972